Yuki Inoue may refer to:

, better known as Satsuki Yukino, Japanese voice actress
, Japanese curler
, Japanese footballer